Neapoli Voion or Neapolis Voion also named Vatika is a small town in Laconia regional unit, southern Greece. It is built near the south end of Malea peninsula, close to the Cape Maleas. It is 335 km southeast of Athens and 115 km south of Sparta. Its port is the gateway for the island of south Peloponnese such as Kythera, Antikythera and Elafonisos. Neapoli is the part of Monemvasia municipality and Voies municipal unit. Its population is 3090 residents according to 2011 census.

History
Neapoli is built on the same site as the ancient Laconian city of Boeae, built in the 10th or 9th century BCE by  the Heracleid Boeus. The city later became part of the city-state of Sparta. During the early Roman era the city belonged to the Koinon of Free Laconians and flourished. The city later declined and was completely destroyed in 375 AD by an earthquake. In the Middle Ages, the name was corrupted to Vatika, which is still used for the local citadel. In modern times in this place there was a village after the name Pezoula. In 1837 the Bavarian architect Birbach designed the street plan of a new town that was named Neapoli ("New Town").

An earthquake occurred on 18 November 2019 between Neapoli Voion and the island of Elafonisos at 03:25 local time, and reached an estimated magnitude of 3,6.

Historical population

Tourism
Offshore from Neapoli is the small island Elafonisos that is known for its big sandy beaches. There are other beaches also around Neapoli. These include the beaches at Neratzionas and Maganos. Near Neapoli, at the village of Kastania, is located the Kastania Cave known also as Cave of Agios Andreas. A village close to Neapolis is Faraklo. It was built by the Venetians and was the most important village of the area during Venetian rule and later Ottoman rule.

Notes
 Maybe the references are mentioned to the 365 Crete earthquake, writing wrongly 375.

References

Monemvasia
Populated places established in 1837
Populated places in Laconia